Roland Bottomley (1880-1947) was a British born American stage and film actor from Liverpool, England. Some sources have him born in 1878 and others in 1879. He came to America circa 1913 and settled in California. He first made movies for the Kalem Company. By the 1920s he acted at Paramount, Fox, Universal and for Thomas H. Ince. After his last film in 1925 he returned to Broadway for the remainder of his career. Bottomley died in New York at the beginning of 1947.

Selected filmography
The Green Cloak (1915)
The Net of Deceit (1915)*short
The Grip of Evil (1916)
The Neglected Wife (1917)
The Devil (1921)
 The Charming Deceiver (1921)
 A Man's Home (1921)
Modern Marriage (1923)
Does It Pay? (1923)
The Dawn of a Tomorrow (1924)
Enticement (1925
Raffles, the Amateur Cracksman (1925)

References

External links

 
 

1880 births
1947 deaths
Male actors from Liverpool
British emigrants to the United States
Burials at Kensico Cemetery